Aleksandr Petrovich Reshetnyak (born October 30, 1948, Kaspiysk, USSR) is a Russian professional football coach and a former player.

References

External links
 Career summary at KLISF

Soviet footballers
FC Dynamo Brest players
Russian football managers
FC Anzhi Makhachkala managers
1948 births
Living people
Association football defenders
FC Dynamo Makhachkala players